Cornouaille may refer to:

 Cornouaille (: Cornwall), Brittany, France
 Pointe de Cornouaille, Cornouaille, Brittany, France; a cape that gives Cornouaille its name
 Diocese of Cornouaille, a Roman Catholic diocese in France
 Kingdom of Cornouaille, a petty kingdom of Celts that was merged into the Kingdom of Brittany
 House of Cornouaille, a ruling house of the Kingdom of Brittany, see List of rulers of Brittany
 Count of Cornouaille (disambiguation)
 Quimper–Cornouaille Airport (IATA airport code: UIP; ICAO airport code: LFRQ) Finistère, Brittany, France
 Parc botanique de Cornouaille (Cornwall Botanic Park)
 Festival de Cornouaille (Cornwall Festival; Cornouaille Kemper)
 Quimper Cornouaille FC, soccer team based in 
 Escadron de Chasse 3/12 Cornouaille, a French Air Force fighter squadron, see List of French Air and Space Force aircraft squadrons

See also

 
 Quimper, Cornouaille, Brittany, France; the traditional capital of Cornouaille
 Cornouailles, England, UK
 Cornwallis (disambiguation)
 Cornwall (disambiguation)
 Kernow (disambiguation)
 Kerne (disambiguation)